Donald Ragnvald Christensen (July 6, 1916 – October 18, 2006) was an American animator, cartoonist, illustrator, writer and inventor. He was sometimes credited as "Don Arr".

Christensen was a graduate of the Minneapolis College of Art and Design in Minneapolis.  After finishing school he worked for the Walt Disney Studio from 1937 to 1941. He left the studio after the 1941 Disney animators' strike, during which he met his wife-to-be, Ivy-Carol Van Horn, a special effects detail artist. Christensen then worked briefly at Warner Bros. Cartoons, primarily as a storyboard artist for Bob Clampett's animation unit. After leaving Warner Bros. he worked independently for nearly four decades as a storyboard writer and artist, primarily for Western Publishing, Dell and Gold Key comic books, as well as Hanna Barbera, Walter Lantz Productions, DePatie-Freleng Enterprises, and other cartoon studios. He wrote and provided illustrations for such comic book titles as Magnus, Robot Fighter, Donald Duck, and Uncle Scrooge. He was involved with the Southern California Comic Artist Professionals Society for many years, and was a past President of the Comic Art Professional Society (CAPS).

Christensen died in Las Vegas, Nevada on October 18, 2006, at the age of 90 of natural causes. He beat the odds that he would not survive past 40, having been a Type I diabetic since the age of 13.

References

Death notice at Toon Zone
Obituary at Mark Evanier's POV

1916 births
2006 deaths
Animators from Minnesota
American cartoonists
Walt Disney Animation Studios people
Hanna-Barbera people
Filmation people
American television writers
American male screenwriters
American male television writers
American storyboard artists
American comics writers
American comics artists
20th-century American male writers
20th-century American writers
People with type 1 diabetes
20th-century American screenwriters
Warner Bros. Cartoons people